Kelvin Burt (born 7 September 1967 in Birmingham) is a British auto racing driver. After attending the Jim Russell Racing Drivers' School in 1987 he turned to Formula Ford racing, battling hard against David Coulthard for the championship. He won his class in a British Touring Car Championship round at Oulton Park, before spending 1991 winning the Formula Vauxhall Lotus series, and being voted Autosport Club Driver of the Year. He moved up to British F3 in 1992, winning the title with Paul Stewart Racing in 1993 with 9 wins, a record for a British driver.

He did some Porsche Supercup races in 1994, becoming the only Brit to win a race in that form of the series. He also became the test driver for the Jordan Grand Prix Formula One team midseason, and the Jordan team put a contract option to consider having him race in F1. However, while that did not come to fruition, he did surface again as a test driver for Arrows in 1996.

For 1995 he had his first full BTCC season, replacing the retiring Andy Rouse in Rouse's Ford team. He took 8th overall, only 2 places behind experienced team-mate Paul Radisich. He then spent 2 years with Tom Walkinshaw's Volvo team, winning a further race. He also did two meetings for GA (then racing as Team Sureterm) in the main class in 2004, scoring 11 points, more than all their other drivers bar Carl Breeze put together.

For 1998 he went to Japan, racing successfully in both Touring Cars and GTs, coming 5th overall in the Touring Car series. He raced in Sweden in 2000 before dominating the British GT series' GTO Class in 2001, taking 8 wins for Parr Motorsport in a Porsche. He was ASCAR runner-up in 2002. In 2003 he raced in the FIA GT Championship for Team Maranello in a Ferrari, taking two third places. In 2006 he did the Porsche Supercup race at Silverstone, but focused on the lower-level Porsche Cup, whilst forging a punditry career as co-commentator to Martin Haven for British F3. He gained wider attention for a huge crash he has during the Porsche Carrera Cup race at Thruxton, in which his car barrel-rolled after contact with James Sutton and cleared a fence. Burt was not badly hurt, although a marshal was treated for shock. As the Carrera race was part of the BTCC meeting at the track, footage was screened by ITV in their coverage of the series.

Racing record

Complete British Touring Car Championship results
(key) Races in bold indicate pole position (1 point awarded – 1996–2002 all races, 2004 just for first race, 1990 and 2002 in class) Races in italics indicate fastest lap (1 point awarded – 1990, 2002 and 2004 all races, 1990 and 2002 in class) * signifies that driver lead race for at least one lap (1 point awarded all races – in 2004 only)

† Not eligible for points

‡ Endurance driver – not eligible for points

Complete Japanese Touring Car Championship results
(key) (Races in bold indicate pole position) (Races in italics indicate fastest lap)

Complete Swedish Touring Car Championship results
(key) (Races in bold indicate pole position) (Races in italics indicate fastest lap)

Complete British GT Championship results
(key) (Races in bold indicate pole position)

24 Hours of Le Mans results

Partial Porsche Supercup results
(key) (Races in bold indicate pole position – 2 points awarded 2008 onwards in all races) (Races in italics indicate fastest lap)

† — Did not finish the race, but was classified as he completed over 90% of the race distance.

‡ — Guest driver – Not eligible for points.

24 Hours of Silverstone results

References

1967 births
Living people
British Touring Car Championship drivers
Sportspeople from Birmingham, West Midlands
English racing drivers
FIA GT Championship drivers
British Formula Three Championship drivers
TC 2000 Championship drivers
Swedish Touring Car Championship drivers
24 Hours of Le Mans drivers
Motorsport announcers
British GT Championship drivers
Porsche Supercup drivers
24 Hours of Spa drivers
ASCAR drivers
Porsche Carrera Cup GB drivers
Britcar 24-hour drivers
BMW M drivers
Paul Stewart Racing drivers
TOM'S drivers
Fortec Motorsport drivers
Porsche Carrera Cup Germany drivers